Sam Houston State Bearkats basketball may refer to:

Sam Houston State Bearkats men's basketball
Sam Houston State Bearkats women's basketball